The 1992–93 Biathlon World Cup was a multi-race tournament over a season of biathlon, organised by the Union Internationale de Pentathlon Moderne. The season started on 17 December 1992 in Pokljuka, Slovenia, and ended on 21 March 1993 in Kontiolahti, Finland. It was the 16th season of the Biathlon World Cup.

Calendar
Below is the IBU World Cup calendar for the 1992–93 season.

 Results from the World Championships did not count toward the World Cup.
 The relays were technically unofficial races as they did not count towards anything in the World Cup.

World Cup Podium

Men

Women

Men's team

Women's team

Standings: Men

Overall 

Final standings after 12 races.

Individual 

Final standings after 6 races.

Sprint 

Final standings after 6 races.

Nation 

Final standings after 18 races.

Standings: Women

Overall 

Final standings after 12 races.

Individual 

Final standings after 6 races.

Sprint 

Final standings after 6 races.

Nation 

Final standings after 18 races.

Medal table

Achievements
Victory in this World Cup (all-time number of victories in parentheses)

Men
 , 2 (6) first places
 , 1 (3) first place
 , 1 (3) first place
 , 1 (3) first place
 , 1 (2) first place
 , 1 (2) first place
 , 1 (2) first place
 , 1 (1) first place
 , 1 (1) first place
 , 1 (1) first place
 , 1 (1) first place

Women
 , 6 (10) first places
 , 2 (4) first places
 , 1 (3) first place
 , 1 (1) first place
 , 1 (1) first place
 , 1 (1) first place

Retirements
Following notable biathletes retired during or after the 1992–93 season:

External links
IBU official site

References

Biathlon World Cup
1992 in biathlon
1993 in biathlon